Ceylanpınar (Ra's al 'Ayn,  Resülayn) is a district of Şanlıurfa Province in southeastern Turkey. It forms a divided city with Ra's al-'Ayn in Syria and there is a border crossing.

Immigration
Evren Paşa neighborhood is populated by Uzbeks, who are Afghan refugees.

Climate 
Ceylanpınar has a hot-summer Mediterranean climate (Köppen climate classification: Csa). Summers are extremely hot with virtually no rain at all, winters tend to be cool but can become very cold due to northeasterly winds.

References 

Şanlıurfa
Syria–Turkey border crossings
Populated places in Şanlıurfa Province
Divided cities on the Turkish-Syrian border
Districts of Şanlıurfa Province
Important Bird Areas of Turkey
Kurdish settlements in Turkey